Monday Night Football (MNF) (also known as Bet365 or Renault Monday Night Football for sponsorship reasons) is a British football programme on Sky Sports which broadcasts live English football from the Premier League.

Original run
Sky television's acquisition of rights to broadcast live Premier League football from the start of the 1992–93 season saw them attempt innovations such as digital on-screen graphics (DOG) and Monday Night live games. The first Monday Night Football game broadcast was between Manchester City and Queens Park Rangers on 17 August 1992, which ended in a 1–1 draw. To give the broadcasts a different look to Sky's Super Sunday strand, the broadcaster introduced the Sky Strikers, a dance troupe similar to American cheerleaders. This pre-match and half-time entertainment was dropped after the first season.

The show had a number of different formats after its launch. The first change led to the merging of Andy Gray's Boot Room format into the show; analysing the previous weekend's football matches utilising the latest computer technology combined with Gray's individual analysis. As the UEFA Champions League gained in importance for Premier League clubs, the number of games played on Monday night declined. Sky Sports then reverted to a format similar to that of Ford Super Sunday with a presenter (Jeff Stelling) and studio guests.

In 2004–05, the analysis section was then incorporated into an additional programme shown after Ford Super Sunday called Ford Super Sunday: The Last Word.

The show ended after the 2006–07 season when Setanta and subsequently ESPN obtained the rights for Monday night Premier League games.

1992-2016 : Ford Monday Night Football

From its launch on August 17, 1992 to May 2016, the programme was previously known as Ford Monday Night Football and was sponsored by Ford, in a partnership between the car giant and Sky Sports that ran for 24 years.

Current run
Monday Night Football returned from the 2010–11 season after Sky regained the rights to Monday night Premier League games. The games broadcast kick off at 8:00 pm on Monday nights. The show also started broadcasting in high-definition. Due to the structure of the broadcasting packages for the 2010–13 seasons, Sky broadcast a minimum of 12 live Premier League games on Monday nights.

Before the departures of Richard Keys and Andy Gray, the programme had a different appearance to Super Sunday, presented by Keys and Gray from a purpose-built studio with Andy Gray's analysis also returning from its Sunday evening slot. After the pair's unscheduled departure from Sky in January 2011, the first half-hour of analysis was dropped, and for the remainder of the season the show was presented from the stadium in largely the same format as Sunday or midweek Premier League matches with a rotation of presenters and pundits, although the distinct "MNF" branding and graphics were retained.

Ed Chamberlin was given the presenting role for the 2011–12 season, with Gary Neville as the new analyst. The show also returned to its previous format in the purpose-built analysis studio, with Chamberlin and Neville carrying out the same roles as Keys and Gray the previous season.

In 2013, Jamie Carragher joined the Monday Night Football show, to form a regular three-man line-up alongside Chamberlin and Neville, after having announced his retirement from football at the end of the 2012–13 season. The first Monday Night Football of the 2013-14 season and Jamie Carragher's first appearance aired on 19 August 2013 with the Manchester City against Newcastle United game. Manchester City won the game 4–0.

Following Neville's appointment as interim head coach of Valencia in December 2015, he left the show to focus on his managerial duties. After leaving Valencia in March 2016 due to a poor run of results, Neville's return to Sky in his previous role was confirmed on 10 August 2016 ahead of the 2016–17 Premier League football season; he made his on-air return on 14 August although from there on he would not appear on every MNF with some episodes would instead involve special guests such as Roy Keane and Thierry Henry appear alongside Carragher.

In 2016 David Jones took over as anchor presenter from Chamberlin who had left Sky to take over ITV's horse racing coverage.

Presenters
1992–2003, 2010–2011: Richard Keys
2003–2005: Ian Payne
2005–2007: Jeff Stelling
2011–2016: Ed Chamberlin 
2016–present: David Jones

Pundits
Jamie Carragher (Primary pundit)
Gary Neville (Main secondary pundit)
Thierry Henry (Frequent secondary pundit)
Roy Keane (Frequent secondary pundit)
Frank Lampard (Two shows, 2015 and 2016)
Roberto Martinez (Two shows, 2015 and 2018)
Brendan Rodgers (One show, 2016)
Jurgen Klopp (One show, 2016)
Ryan Giggs (One show, 2016)
Claudio Ranieri (One show, 2017)
Alan Pardew (One show, 2017)
Craig Bellamy (One show, 2017)
Wayne Rooney (Two shows, 2018 and 2022)
Graeme Souness (One show, 2018)
Rafael Benítez (One show, 2019)
Micah Richards (One show, 2020)
Mauricio Pochettino (One show, 2020)
Eddie Howe (One show, 2020)
Rob Green (One show, 2021)
Chris Coleman (One show, 2021)
Mark Hughes (One show, 2021)
Steph Houghton (One show, 2021)
Dominic Calvert-Lewin (One show, 2021)

References

Sky Sports
Sky UK original programming
1992 British television series debuts
1990s British sports television series
2000s British sports television series
2010s British sports television series
2020s British sports television series
British television series revived after cancellation
Premier League on television
Monday